Janeek Brown (born 14 May 1998) is a Jamaican athlete who specializes in the 100m Hurdles. Her personal best is in the 100m hurdles is 12.40s.  Currently that time ranks her tied for #17 on the all time list.  She set the mark while winning the 2019 NCAA Championships, running for the University of Arkansas as a sophomore.

Biography
Brown tied for the second fastest in NCAA history, a tick off Brianna Rollins' 12.39.  It also became the pending Jamaican record, though it will not be ratified because Danielle Williams superseded it with a 12.32 run later in the season during the Diamond League.  That same day she ran a Razorbacks school record of 22.40 in the 200 metres.  The two marks combined 34.80 beat the world record for same day performance previously held by Jackie Joyner-Kersee, from her world record heptathlon at the 1988 Olympics.

NCAA
Brown is the Arkansas Razorbacks track and field and Southeastern Conference 100 meter hurdles all time record setter. In 2019, as a sophomore, Brown earned her fifth NCAA Division I All-American track and field award.

Professional
She had previously represented Jamaica at the 2014 Summer Youth Olympics.  Based on the hurdle mark, she qualified to represent Jamaica at the 2019 World Championships, qualifying for the final.  She ultimately finished in seventh place.  Her hurdle mark qualifies her for the 2020 Olympics, however she must still be named to the highly competitive Jamaican team.

In July 2019, Brown chose to represent Puma as a title sponsor following a 2019 world leading time.

Competition record

References

External links
Diamond League profile for Janeek Brown
World Athletics profile for Janeek Brown

Living people
1998 births
Jamaican female hurdlers
Jamaican female sprinters
World Athletics Championships athletes for Jamaica
Athletes (track and field) at the 2014 Summer Youth Olympics
Arkansas Razorbacks women's track and field athletes
People from Kingston, Jamaica